The Worshipful Company of Chartered Surveyors is one of the Livery Companies of the City of London. The organisation  was granted Letters Patent in May 1977. The Company promotes surveying by awarding scholarships.

The Company ranks eighty-fifth in the order of precedence for Livery Companies. Its motto is Modus ab initio, which is Latin for "Method from the very beginning" and its church is St Lawrence Jewry The landscape painter Richard Howard Penton's drawings in Halls of the Livery Companies of the City of London were re-published in 1981 to mark their grant of livery status.

The Company does not have its own livery hall and meets and dines in a selection of the 35 different livery halls in London.

See also
 Royal Institution of Chartered Surveyors

References

External links
 The Chartered Surveyors Company

Surveyors
Organizations established in 1977
Trade associations based in the United Kingdom
Chartered Surveyors
1977 establishments in England
Surveying organizations